Bunso Arboretum is a botanical garden located at Bunso in the East Akim District of the Eastern Region in Ghana.

Location

Facilities
The arboretum contains different species of flowers and trees. It has a butterfly sanctuary and a canopy walkway, the second to be built in Ghana.

See also
 Aburi Botanical Gardens

References

Botanical gardens in Ghana